A Soldier's Oath is a lost 1915 silent film drama directed by Oscar Apfel and starring William Farnum. It was produced by William Fox.

Cast
William Farnum - Pierre Duval
Dorothy Bernard - Margot
Kittens Reichert - Mavis Duval, at 5
Alma Frederic - Mavis Duval, at 8
Henry Herbert - Lazare (as H. J. Herbert)
Walter Connolly - Raoul de Reyntiens
Louise Thatcher - Duchess D'Auberg
Benjamin Marburgh - Duke D'Auberg
Henry A. Barrows - Count de Morave
Will Lois - Jacques
Louis V. Hart - Pere Crisset
Louise Mackin - Sister Superior
Ruth Findlay - (uncredited)

See also
List of Fox Film films
1937 Fox vault fire

References

External links
 A Soldier's Oath at IMDb.com

lobby poster - rereleased 1918
 alt. poster
more poster advertisement, rare (Ha)

1915 films
American silent feature films
Films directed by Oscar Apfel
Lost American films
Fox Film films
American black-and-white films
Silent American drama films
1915 drama films
1915 lost films
Lost drama films
1910s American films